The following is a list of notable persons (students, alumni, faculty or academic affiliates) associated with San José State University, located in the American city of San Jose, California.

Notable alumni

Academia
Bettina Aptheker — author, professor, political activist
Marshall Drummond — former chancellor, California Community College System
Harry Edwards — Professor Emeritus of Sociology, University of California, Berkeley; author of The Revolt of the Black Athlete
Lawrence H. Keeley — archaeologist; professor, University of Illinois Chicago; author of War Before Civilization
Mary Lyons — President, University of San Diego
Henry Suzzallo — former president, University of Washington
Jennifer Wilby — Director of the Centre for Systems Studies, University of Hull
Hamza Yusuf — Islamic scholar

Artists and musicians
Amber Aguirre — American ceramic sculptor
Bernd Behr — artist
Mary Blair — artist and illustrator who helped create Disney's Cinderella (1950), Alice in Wonderland (1951) and Peter Pan (1953)
Lindsey Buckingham — musician best known for Fleetwood Mac (attended SJSU, but did not graduate) 
Doug Clifford — rock drummer best known for his work as a founding member of Creedence Clearwater Revival 
Stu Cook — bass guitarist best known for his work with  Creedence Clearwater Revival (attended SJSU, but did not graduate) 
Irene Dalis — New York Metropolitan Opera star and founder of Opera San Jose
Allan Graham — visual artist (studied at SJSU; graduated from University of New Mexico)
Robert Graham — internationally acclaimed sculptor whose work includes the Olympic Gateway in Los Angeles (attended SJSU before transferring to San Francisco Art Institute)
Tom Johnston — rock guitarist and vocalist best known for his work as a founding member of The Doobie Brothers
Paul Kantner — rock guitarist best known for his work as a founding member of Jefferson Airplane
Titus Kaphar — American contemporary painter and 2018 MacArthur Fellows Program Genius Award recipient 
David Kuraoka — ceramic artist
Sal Maccarone — nationally acclaimed woodworker and sculptor whose work includes "The Spirit of Tenaya" in Yosemite National Park Bryan "Brain" Mantia — drummer, Primus, Guns N' Roses, Tom Waits, Buckethead
Ann Millikan — musician and composer 
Stevie Nicks — musician best known for Fleetwood Mac (attended SJSU, but did not graduate)Larry Norman — Christian rock musician, singer and songwriter; founding member of the '60s rock band People! (attended SJSU, but did not graduate)Fred H. Roster — sculptor
Judy Shintani — artist
Patrick Simmons — rock guitarist and vocalist best known for his work as a founding member of The Doobie Brothers
Gordon Smedt – pop artist and painter (studied graphic design and illustration at SJSU from 1982–1984; graduated from Art Center College of Design)Wayne Thiebaud — painter (studied at SJSU from 1949–1950; graduated from Sacramento State University)Cal Tjader — Grammy Award-winning jazz musician (studied at SJSU; graduated from San Francisco State University)Michael Whelan — artist and illustrator specializing in imaginative realism; Science Fiction Hall of Fame inductee

Authors
Lorna Dee Cervantes — poet, Pulitzer Prize nominee
William J. Craddock — novelist, author of Be Not Content and Twilight CandelabraCarmen Giménez Smith — poet, American Book Award winner
James D. Houston  — co-author of Farewell to Manzanar; author of Continental Drift, Snow Mountain Passage, and others; Lurie Distinguished Visiting Professor of Creative Writing at SJSU in Spring 2006
Jeanne Wakatsuki Houston — co-author of Farewell to ManzanarJayne Ann Krentz — New York Times bestselling author
Ella Leffland — novelist (Rumors of Peace) and short story writer (Last Courtesies and Other Stories)
Edwin Markham — poet
Patricia A. McKillip — novelist
Sandra McPherson — poet
Robert Scoble — blogger, author, and social media pioneer
Amy Tan — novelist; author of The Joy Luck ClubAviation
Jason Dahl — airline pilot and United Airlines Flight 93 captain who died in the September 11 attacks

Business
Terry Alderete — businesswoman
Helder Antunes — Senior Director, Cisco Systems; chairman of the board, OpenFog Consortium
James F. Boccardo — trial lawyer, businessman, and philanthropist
Finis Conner — founder, Conner Peripherals and co-founder of Seagate Technology
Ron Conway — billionaire angel investor and philanthropist; co-founder and former CEO of Altos Computer Systems
Robert Frankenberg — former CEO, Novell
Carl Guardino — President and CEO, Silicon Valley Leadership Group
Omid Kordestani — Senior Vice President, Google
Brian Krzanich — CEO, CDK Global and former CEO, Intel Corporation
Jenny Ming — CEO, Charlotte Russe; former CEO of Old Navy
Gordon Moore — co-founder, Intel Corporation (studied two years at SJSU; graduated from U.C. Berkeley)Louis Nguyen — Chairman and CEO, Saigon Asset Management
Ed Oates — co-founder, Oracle Corporation
Daniel R. Scoggin — founder and CEO, TGI Fridays
Mike Sinyard — founder and CEO, Specialized Bicycle Components
James E. Thompson — founder and chairman, Crown Worldwide Group

Film, theatre, and TV
Coby Bell — actor; best known for his role as NYPD officer Tyrone Davis, Jr. on the NBC drama Third WatchDanny Lee Clark — actor, writer and producer; played Nitro on American GladiatorsRosanna DeSoto — film actress, best for her role of Connie Valenzuela in the 1987 film La BambaDebrah Farentino — film and television actress; model (attended SJSU; transferred to UCLA)Jerry Juhl — head writer and producer for The Muppets and Fraggle RockOmar Benson Miller — actor
Steve Silver — founder of Beach Blanket Babylon, a popular cabaret show in San Francisco
Kurtwood Smith — actor, best known for the role of Red Forman on That '70s ShowThe Smothers Brothers — comedians
Bobbi Starr — pornographic actress
Luis Valdez — Chicano playwright, screenwriter and director best known for his movie La BambaYousef Erakat — Actor, Comedian, Vlogger 

Journalism
Chauncey Bailey — Oakland Post editor-in-chief; murdered in 2007
Grant Brisbee — San Francisco Giants writer for The Athletic
Kim Komenich — photojournalist, filmmaker and teacher; Pulitzer Prize winner (1987) 
John Kouns — photojournalist during the Civil Rights Movement
Tony Kovaleski — broadcast journalist (KNTV-TV); multiple Emmy awards; winner of the Alfred I. duPont-Columbia University Award (2010)
Steve Lopez — newspaper columnist, Los Angeles Times; novelist
Dave Meltzer —editor of the Wrestling Observer NewsletterAnacleto Rapping — photojournalist and teacher; three-time Pulitzer Prize winner 
Marcio Sanchez — photojournalist; Pulitzer Prize winner (2021) 
Steve Starr — photojournalist; Pulitzer Prize winner (1970)
Julie Tilsner — author, contributing editor for Parenting Magazine and former Businessweek reporter
David Willman — reporter; Pulitzer Prize winner (2001)

Miscellaneous
Christopher Darden — prosecutor in the O. J. Simpson murder case
Dirk Dirksen — godfather of San Francisco punk; tour manager for The Doors, Iron Butterfly, The Supremes and Ray Charles; owner of the Mabuhay Gardens punk club in San Francisco (attended SJSU, but did not graduate
Rob Janoff — Graphic designer best known for his creation of the Apple logo
Harry W. Jenkins — Major General, U.S. Marine Corps
Jessica McClintock — fashion designer
Anthony Poshepny, aka Tony Poe — legendary CIA paramilitary officer

Politics and government
Richard C. Baldwin — Associate Justice of the Oregon Supreme Court
James T. Beall Jr. — California Assemblyman, 24th district, and former Santa Clara County Supervisor
Lee P. Brown — former Mayor of Houston; former Police Commissioner of New York City; former Director of the Office of National Drug Control Policy
Ben Nighthorse Campbell — former U.S. Senator from Colorado
Albert E. Carter — former U.S. Congressman
David C. Casas  — former mayor of Los Altos and Los Altos city council member
Cindy Chavez — former member of San Jose City Council and former vice mayor of San Jose
Judy Chirco  — San José City councilmember, District 9
William Clark, Jr. — former U.S. Ambassador to India
Michael Deaver — Deputy White House Chief of Staff for President Ronald Reagan
Robert Doerr — former Mayor of San Jose, California (1956–1958)
Paul Fong — California Assemblyman, 22nd district
Robert "Bob" Foster — Mayor of Long Beach, California; former president, Southern California Edison; former CSU Trustee
Mike Honda — U.S. Representative from California
Lou Henry Hoover — former First Lady of the United States
Johnny Khamis — Councilmember on the San Jose City Council 
Linda J. LeZotte  — San Jose City councilmember, District 1
Evan Low — California State Assemblyman; member of California Legislative LGBTQ Caucus
Gus Morrison — Mayor of Fremont, California (1985–1989; 1994–2004; since January 2012)
Gaylord Nelson — former U.S. Senator; Governor of Wisconsin; founder of Earth Day
Lyn Nofziger — White House advisor to presidents Richard Nixon and Ronald Reagan
Robert Rivas — California State Assemblyman
Ed Rollins — National Campaign Director for Reagan–Bush (1984) and Mike Huckabee (2007); regular guest political analyst on CNN (attended SJSU; graduated from CSU Chico)Jim Silva — California State Assemblyman; former mayor of Huntington Beach
Laurie Smith — Sheriff, Santa Clara County; first female county sheriff in the history of the state of California
Fernando Torres-Gil — first assistant secretary for aging at the Department of Health and Human Services in the Clinton Administration; associate dean of the School of Public Affairs at UCLA
Joe Trippi — presidential campaign manager for Howard Dean (2004)
Sim Tze Tzin — Malaysian politician
Carole Ward Allen  — former BART board director, District 4; former Oakland port commissioner
Kent Wiedemann — former U.S. Ambassador to Cambodia
Ken Yeager — politician, member of Santa Clara County Board of Supervisors

Science and technology
Barbara Bekins – hydrologist and National Academy of Engineering fellow 
Daniel W. Bradley — co-discoverer of Hepatitis C
Sarah Clatterbuck — computer engineer
Ray Dolby — engineer, founder of Dolby Laboratories (studied two years at SJSU; graduated from Stanford University)Dian Fossey — ethologist and gorilla expert
Charles Ginsburg — engineer, inventor of the videocassette recorder; National Inventors Hall of Fame inductee
Jan Koum — billionaire entrepreneur, co-founder and CEO of WhatsApp; managing director at Facebook, Inc. (attended SJSU, but did not graduate) 
Gordon Moore — scientist, author of Moore's Law
Roger Wakimoto — atmospheric scientist, tornado expert, director of NCAR and NSF
James Lewis Wayman — 2013 Fellow of the Institute of Electrical and Electronics Engineers

Sports

Baseball

Jeff Ball — former Major League Baseball player, San Francisco Giants
Aaron Bates — Major League Baseball player, Boston Red Sox
Mike Brown — former Major League Baseball player, California Angels and Pittsburgh Pirates
Ken Caminiti — former Major League Baseball player, Houston Astros et al.
Anthony Chavez — former Major League Baseball player, California Angels
Chris Codiroli — former Major League Baseball player, Oakland Athletics
Kevin Frandsen  — Major League Baseball player, Philadelphia Phillies
Gary Hughes — former Major League Baseball assistant coach, Chicago Cubs
Pat Hughes — play-by-play radio broadcaster for Chicago Cubs
Jason Jimenez — former Major League Baseball player, Detroit Tigers and Tampa Bay Devil Rays
Randy Johnson — former Major League Baseball player, Atlanta Braves
Brad Kilby — Major League Baseball player, Oakland Athletics
Hal Kolstad — former Major League Baseball player, Boston Red Sox
Mark Langston — former Major League Baseball player, Seattle Mariners, California Angels, et al.
Larry Lintz — former Major League Baseball player, Montreal Expos et al.
John Oldham — former Major League Baseball player, Cincinnati Reds
Jason Simontacchi — former Major League Baseball player, St. Louis Cardinals and Washington Nationals
Anthony Telford — former Major League Baseball player, Baltimore Orioles, Montreal Expos, et al.
Carlos Torres — Major League Baseball player, Chicago White Sox

Basketball

Tariq Abdul-Wahad (Olivier Saint-Jean)  — former NBA player (Sacramento Kings)
Ricky Berry — former NBA player (Sacramento Kings)
Brandon Clarke — NBA player (Memphis Grizzlies)
Coby Dietrick — former NBA player (San Antonio Spurs and Golden State Warriors)
Dick Groves — former NBA player (San Diego Rockets)
Darnell "Dr. Dunk" Hillman — former NBA player (Indiana Pacers, New Jersey Nets et al.)
Ed Hughes — former BAA player (Washington Capitols)
Stu Inman — former NBA player and coach (Chicago Stags, Portland Trail Blazers, et al.)
Wally Rank — former NBA player (San Diego Clippers)
Sid Williams — former NBA player (Portland Trail Blazers)

Football

Courtney Anderson — former NFL tight end, Atlanta Falcons and Oakland Raiders
Marcus Arroyo — head football coach, UNLV 
Stacey Bailey — former NFL wide receiver, Atlanta Falcons
Keith Birlem — former SJSU quarterback, NFL player, member of San Jose State Hall of Fame
Kim Bokamper — former NFL linebacker, Miami Dolphins
John Broussard — NFL wide receiver, Jacksonville Jaguars
Gill Byrd — former NFL defensive back, San Diego Chargers; two NFL Pro Bowl appearances
Jim Cadile — former NFL guard, Chicago Bears
Sheldon Canley — former NFL running back, San Francisco 49ers and New York Jets
Matt Castelo — former NFL linebacker, Seattle Seahawks; former CFL linebacker, Hamilton Tiger-cats
Steve Clarkson — nationally renowned quarterbacks coach; founder of Steve Clarkson Dreammaker quarterback camp
Sherman Cocroft — former NFL defensive back, Kansas City Chiefs
Clarence Cunningham — former AFL wide receiver, defensive back, running back, and kick returner; former AF2 starter, Stockton Lightning; IFL free safety, Catania Elephants
Neal Dahlen — former SJSU quarterback, NFL manager and scout; holds the record for the most earned Super Bowl rings at seven
Rashied Davis — NFL wide receiver, Chicago Bears
Yonus Davis — CFL running back, BC Lions
Steve DeBerg — former NFL quarterback, Dallas Cowboys
David Diaz-Infante — former NFL and CFL offensive guard, San Diego Chargers, Denver Broncos, Philadelphia Eagles, and Sacramento Gold Miners
Oscar Donahue — former NFL wide receiver, Minnesota Vikings
Terry Donahue — UCLA head football coach; College Football Hall of Fame inductee (attended SJSU for one year)Leon Donohue, former NFL offensive lineman, San Francisco 49ers and Dallas Cowboys 
Carl Ekern — former NFL linebacker, Los Angeles Rams; one NFL Pro Bowl appearance
David Fales -NFL quarterback, New York Jets
Mervyn Fernandez —former NFL wide receiver, Los Angeles Raiders
Coye Francies  — NFL defensive back, Cleveland Browns
Jeff Garcia — NFL quarterback, San Francisco 49ers et al.; four NFL Pro Bowl appearances
Trestin George — CFL defensive back, BC Lions
Jarron Gilbert – NFL defensive tackle, Chicago Bears
Charlie Harraway — former NFL running back, Washington Redskins and Cleveland Browns
Paul Held — former NFL quarterback, Pittsburgh Steelers and Green Bay Packers
Willie Heston — former SJSU halfback;  College Football Hall of Fame inductee (attended SJSU from 1898–1900; graduated from University of Michigan)James Hodgins — former NFL fullback, St. Louis Rams et al. 
Duke Ihenacho — NFL safety, Denver Broncos
Johnny Johnson — former NFL running back, New York Jets; one NFL Pro Bowl appearance; consensus choice for Rookie of the Year (1990)
Cody Jones — NFL defensive tackle, Los Angeles Rams; one NFL Pro Bowl appearance
James Jones — NFL wide receiver, Oakland Raiders
Rick Kane — former NFL running back, Detroit Lions
Bob Ladouceur — among winningest high school football coaches in U.S. history; coached De La Salle High Spartans to 151 consecutive wins from 1992 to 2003
Bill Leavy — NFL referee; officiated Super Bowl XL
Dwight Lowery — NFL defensive back, New York Jets and two-time All-American at SJSU
Joe Nedney — NFL kicker, San Francisco 49ers
William Yaw Obeng — Arena Football League lineman, San Jose Sabercats
Chris Owens — NFL defensive back, Atlanta Falcons
Tom Petitthome — former AFL player, San Jose Sabercats
Art Powell — NFL wide receiver, Oakland Raiders; Raiders' 7th all-time leading receiver
Waylon Prather — former NFL punter, New Orleans Saints, New York Jets and Arizona Cardinals
 Jim Psaltis — former NFL defensive back
David Richmond — NFL wide receiver, Cincinnati Bengals
Scott Rislov — AFL quarterback, San Jose Sabercats
Al Saunders — former NFL head coach for the San Diego Chargers
Rufus Skillern — CFL and NFL wide receiver, BC Lions and Baltimore Ravens
Gerald Small — former NFL defensive back, Miami Dolphins
Carl Sullivan — former NFL defensive end, Green Bay Packers
Adam Tafralis — CFL quarterback, Hamilton Tiger-Cats
Tyson Thompson —NFL kick returner, Dallas Cowboys
Bob Titchenal — former NFL linebacker, Washington Redskins and Los Angeles Dons; one Pro Bowl appearance; former head football coach, University of New Mexico and SJSU
Paul Varelans  - retired professional MMA fighter formerly with the UFC
Dick Vermeil — NFL head coach; winning coach, Super Bowl XXXIV"Dick Vermeil, Head Coach" , Kansas City Chiefs
Bill Walsh — NFL head coach; winning coach, Super Bowl XVI, Super Bowl XIX, and Super Bowl XXIII; Pro Football Hall of Fame inducteeBill Walsh Of The 49ers Is Named SJSU's 2001 Tower Award Winner , 2001, CSU Newsline
Gerald Willhite — former NFL running back, Denver Broncos
Billy Wilson — former NFL receiver, San Francisco 49ers; six NFL Pro Bowl appearances
Louis Wright — former NFL defensive back, Denver Broncos; 1st round NFL draft pick; five NFL Pro Bowl appearances
Roy Zimmerman — former NFL quarterback, Washington Redskins; one Pro Bowl appearance

Golf
Ron Cerrudo — PGA golfer and tour winner
Bob Eastwood — PGA golfer and tour winner
Pat Hurst — LPGA golfer and tour winner; #16 on the all-time LPGA money list
Juli Inkster — LPGA golfer; two-time U.S. Women's Open winner (1999 and 2002); #4 on the all-time LPGA money list
Mark Lye — PGA golfer and tour winner
Roger Maltbie — PGA golfer and tour winner
Janice Moodie — LPGA golfer and tour winner
Arron Oberholser — PGA golfer; AT&T Pebble Beach National Pro-Am winner (2006)
Patty Sheehan — LPGA golfer; two-time U.S. Women's Open winner (1992 and 1994)
Ken Venturi — PGA golfer; 1964 U.S. Open winner and Sports Illustrated "Sportsman of the Year"
Mark Wiebe — PGA golfer and tour winner

Olympic Games

Charles Adkins — 1952 Olympian (boxing); gold medalist
Kevin Asano — 1988 Olympian (judo); silver medalist; USA Judo Hall of Fame inductee
Bob Berland — 1984 Olympian (judo); silver medalist
Felix Böhni — 1980 and 1984 Olympian (pole vault)
Vinnie Bradford — 1984 Olympian (fencing)
Suzannah Brookshire-Gonzales — 2020 Olympian (softball)
Colton Brown — 2016 and 2020 Olympian (judo)
Ed Burke — 1964 and 1968 Olympian (track and field), U.S.A. Flagbearer at the 1984 Opening Ceremonies in Los Angeles
Russ Camilleri — 1960 and 1964 Olympian (freestyle and Greco Roman wrestling)
Robin Campbell — 1984 Olympian (track and field – 800 metres)
John Carlos — 1968 Olympian (track and field – 200 meters); bronze medalist; best known for giving raised fist salute from the medalist's podium during the 1968 Summer Olympic Games in Mexico City
Dedy Cooper — 1980 Olympian (track and field – 110 meter hurdles)
Michelle Cox — 2020 Olympian (softball)
Jim Doehring — 1992 Olympian (track and field – shot put); silver medalist
Emma Entzminger — 2020 Olympian (softball)
Clara Espar Llaquet — 2020 Olympian (water polo); silver medalist
Lee Evans — 1968 Olympian (track and field – 4x400 meters and 400 meters); two-time gold medalist and world record holder
Jeff Fishback — 1964 Olympian (track and field)
George Haines — swim coach for seven U.S. Olympic teams; head swim coach at UCLA and Stanford University
Steve Hamann — 1980 Olympian (water polo)
Mike Hernandez — 1972 Olympian (soccer)
Mitch Ivey — 1968 and 1972 Olympian (swimming);  silver and bronze medalist
Margaret Jenkins — 1928 Olympian (track and field)
Stacey Johnson — 1980 Olympian (fencing)
Russ Lockwood — 1976 Olympian (Greco Roman wrestling) 
Marti Malloy — 2012 Olympian (judo); bronze medalist
Keith Nakasone — 1980 Olympian (judo)
Ben Nighthorse Campbell — 1964 Olympian (judo)
Ray Norton — 1960 Olympian (track and field)
Christos Papanikolaou — 1968 Olympian (track and field – pole vault); world record holder (first man over 18 feet)
John Powell — 1976 and 1984 Olympian (track and field – discus); two-time bronze medalist
Raju Rai — 2008 Olympian (men's singles badminton)
Ronnie Ray Smith — 1968 Olympian (track and field athlete – 4 × 100 meters); gold medalist and world record holder
Tommie Smith — 1968 Olympian (track and field athlete – 200 meters); gold medalist; best known for giving raised fist salute from the medalist's podium during the 1968 Summer Olympic Games
Willie Steele —1948 Olympian (track and field – long jump); gold medalist
Robyn Stevens — 2020 Olympian (20k race walking)
Jill Sudduth — 1996 Olympian (synchronized swimming): gold medalist
Mike Swain — 1988 Olympian (judo); bronze medalist; first American male to win the World Judo Championships
Lynn Vidali — 1968 and 1972 Olympian (swimming); silver and bronze medalist
Jim Zylker — 1972 Olympian (soccer)

Other
 Isai Alvarado — professional Super Smash Bros. player
 Joey Chestnut — competitive eater; world record holder
 Shane Golobic — dirt track racing driver
 Krazy George Henderson — professional cheerleader and self-proclaimed inventor of the audience wave
 Ryan Suarez — former MLS soccer player (Los Angeles Galaxy and Dallas Burn)
 Yoshihiro Uchida — head coach, SJSU judo team; team coach, 1964 U.S. Olympic judo team; instrumental in developing organized intercollegiate judo competition in the U.S.
 Peter Ueberroth — Major League Baseball Commissioner (1984 –1989); U.S. Olympic Committee chair; Time magazine's "Man of the Year"
 Robert Wall — actor and martial artist
 Justin Willis — professional Mixed Martial Artist, current UFC Heavyweight

Faculty and staff
James J. Asher — Professor Emeritus of psychology; inventor of Total Physical Response (TPR)
Dwight Bentel — driving force behind the development of the SJSU School of Journalism and Mass Communications
Elbert Botts — former chemistry professor; California Department of Transportation employee; inventor of Botts dots
Celia Correas de Zapata — former Spanish professor; world expert on Latin American women's fiction; widely published author
Paul Douglass — English professor; renowned literary scholar; winner of the 2007 Elma Dangerfield award for his publication of new and original work related to the life and times of the poet Lord Byron;
Daniel Goldston — mathematics professor; developed breakthrough methods for proving there are arbitrarily large primes that are unusually close together
Lou Harrison — former composer-in-residence; world-renowned composer
Fred Iltis — Holocaust emigre and entomologist
Persis Karim — former co-director of the Persian Studies Program, and professor.
Jessica Mitford — former sociology professor; renowned muckraking journalist; author of The American Way of DeathBruce Ogilvie — psychology professor; renowned sports psychologist
Rudy Rucker — former computer science professor; renowned science fiction author; often credited as a founding father of cyberpunk
Frederick Spratt  — art professor (1956–1989) and art department chair; known for his Color Theory paintings; founder of the Frederick Spratt Gallery in San Jose
Shelby Steele — former English professor; writer; documentary filmmaker; author of The Content of our Character; Emmy Award winner; National Book Critics Circle Award winner
Allen Strange — Professor Emeritus of music; renowned musician and composer; author of Electronic Music: Systems, Techniques, and Controls, a key text on modular analog synthesis; author of other texts on modern music practices
Lloyd (Bud) Winter — track coach; produced over 100 All-Americans and nine Olympians at SJSU; coached SJSU track team to two NCAA national titles; National Track and Field Hall of Fame inductee; author of So You Want to be a Sprinter''

References

San Jose, California-related lists
San Jose State University